Ruben Romeo Corbo Burmia (born 20 January 1952) is a retired Uruguayan football striker who played for several clubs in Latin America, including C.A. Peñarol and Club de Futbol Monterrey.

Corbo received 22 caps for the Uruguay national football team, and played at the 1974 FIFA World Cup.
He's brother of Walter Corbo, second goalkeeper of Uruguay in Mexico 1970.

Career
Known as el Pato (because of his characteristic walk), Corbo played professional football in Mexico after playing for Uruguay at the 1974 World Cup. After a successful six-season spell at Monterrey where he scored 70 official goals for the club, Corbo joined Tampico F.C. for the 1980–81 Primera División season. He was an immediate success with Tampico, where he reunited with former Monterrey teammates Basilio Bacho Salazar, Jorge Garibaldi and Francisco Bertocchi. After Tampico was dissolved following the 1981–82 Primera División season, Corbo moved to Tampico-Madero for two more seasons before retiring.

References

External links

1952 births
Living people
Uruguayan footballers
Uruguayan expatriate footballers
Uruguay international footballers
Association football forwards
Uruguayan Primera División players
Liga MX players
C.F. Monterrey players
Tampico Madero F.C. footballers
Peñarol players
1974 FIFA World Cup players
Expatriate footballers in Mexico